Mygra is a rural locality (a village) in Gorodishchenskoye Rural Settlement, Nyuksensky District, Vologda Oblast, Russia. The population was 12 as of 2002.

Geography 
Mygra is located 35 km southeast of Nyuksenitsa (the district's administrative centre) by road. Makarino is the nearest rural locality.

References 

Rural localities in Nyuksensky District